Pekka Mellavuo (27 November 1913 – 27 January 1992) was a Finnish wrestler. He competed in the men's freestyle light heavyweight at the 1948 Summer Olympics.

References

External links
 

1913 births
1992 deaths
People from Suoyarvsky District
People from Viipuri Province (Grand Duchy of Finland)
Finnish male sport wrestlers
Olympic wrestlers of Finland
Wrestlers at the 1948 Summer Olympics